Abdu al-Hamuli (1836 – May 12, 1901) was an Egyptian musician.
He married the Egyptian singer Sokaina, who went by the name of Almaz and formed together a very famous musical duet in Egypt at that time.

See also 
Lists of Egyptians

References

1836 births
1901 deaths
19th-century Egyptian male singers